The Ruby Crest National Recreation Trail is a National Recreation Trail in the upper elevations of the central Ruby Mountains, in Elko County, Nevada, United States. Approximately  in length, the trail is used by hikers and pack trains to experience some of the most spectacular scenery in the western United States.

From there it climbs northward around Green and Tipton Peaks, while crossing the three upper forks of Smith Creek. It then climbs steeply to a  pass, and descends to scenic Overland Lake.

The next section of trail most closely follows the actual crest of the Rubies, and is therefore the driest. The trail circles around the upper parts of Overland Creek, passes King Peak , climbs to the crest, and then stays above  while passing Long and Mahogany Canyons. After crossing over the top of Wine's Peak , it finally descends again into forested areas. A short side trail leads to North Furlong Lake, a common campsite.

The northern section of the trail includes the most spectacular alpine scenery. The trail drops into Kleckner Canyon (with distant views of Ruby Dome) and crosses Kleckner Creek just below Favre and Castle Lakes. It then climbs to Liberty Lake and Liberty Pass .

The USGS 7.5 minute topographic quadrangles that include the length of the trail are: Ruby Dome, Franklin Lake NW, Green Mountain, Harrison Pass, Franklin Lake SW, and Lee.

Notes

External links 
 Ruby Crest Trail information from Backpacking in the Ruby Mountains.com

Ruby Mountains
Protected areas of Elko County, Nevada
Humboldt–Toiyabe National Forest
Protected areas of the Great Basin
Hiking trails in Nevada
National Recreation Trails in Nevada